The 1971 Dutch farmers' revolt took place on 21 December 1971 in the municipality of Tubbergen in Overijssel, the Netherlands. The rebellion was set off by an intended land consolidation of, in particular, agricultural land.

Voting 
In the stakeholder vote on the land consolidation plan there were 2,938 eligible voters, about 1,200 of whom were farmers. Only 27 votes were cast, 15 in favor and 12 against the proposal. Despite the low turnout, the plan was approved, because the votes that were not cast were considered to be in favor. This was seen as unfair by many residents of the municipality.

Riots 
Riots erupted in the villages of Tubbergen and Geesteren. The windows of the town hall were smashed and the residence of mayor  was set on fire. Riot police was deployed and several people were injured, one police officer was even stabbed in the back. In 1972, a report on the events was discussed in the House of Representatives.

Aftermath 
On 26 March 1973, a new vote on the land consolidation took place. The plan was rejected by majority vote, after which it wasn't considered for implementation again.

In 2021, a theater production looked back on this turbulent episode. Fifty years later, there were still mixed feelings about the 'revolt' in Tubbergen.

Images

See also 
 1963 Dutch farmers' revolt
 1989–1990 Dutch farmers' protests
 Dutch farmers' protests

References 

1971 in the Netherlands
1971 protests
Agriculture in the Netherlands
History of Overijssel
Protests in the Netherlands